Lampasas may stand for:
 Lampasas, Texas
 Lampasas County, Texas
 Lampasas River
 Lampasas Independent School District
 Lampasas High School 
 Lampasas Group, a geologic group in Indiana